Reduit or Réduit may refer to:
 Reduit - a fortified structure such as a citadel
 Réduit, Moka - a suburb in the village of Moka, Mauritius
 National Redoubt (Belgium) - a  defensive belt of fortifications in Belgium
 Fort du Trou-d'Enfer ( Réduit du Trou-d'Enfer) - one of the fortifications of Paris
 Réduit (Switzerland) - the Swiss National Redoubt